The following is a list of events affecting Canadian television in 2011. Events listed include television show debuts, finales, cancellations, and channel launches, closures and rebrandings.

Events

January

February

March

April

May

June

August

September

October

November

Television programs

Programs debuting in 2011 

Series currently listed here have been announced by their respective networks as scheduled to premiere in 2011. Note that shows may be delayed or cancelled by the network between now and their scheduled air dates.

Programs ending in 2011

Made for TV movies & miniseries

Deaths

Television stations

Debuts

Network affiliation changes

Closures

See also 
 2011 in Canada
 List of Canadian films of 2011

References